The huge moth family Noctuidae contains the following genera:

A B C D E F G H I J K L M N O P Q R S T U V W X Y Z

Janaesia
Janseodes
Janthinea
Jarasana
Jaspidia
Jaxartia
Jocheaera
Jochroa
Jodia
Juncaria
Jussalypena

References 

 Natural History Museum Lepidoptera genus database

 
Noctuid genera J